The Vishera is a river in Malovishersky and Novgorodsky Districts, Novgorod Oblast, Russia, a right tributary of the Maly Volkhovets, an eastern armlet  of the Volkhov.

The Vishera river originates from the confluence of the Malaya Vishera (left) and the Bolshaya Vishera (right) several kilometers southwest of the town of Malaya Vishera, close to the border of Malovishersky and Novgorodsky Districts. From the confluence, the Vishera flows southwest and enters Novgorodsky District.

References 

Rivers of Novgorod Oblast